Broadway station is a Detroit People Mover station in Downtown Detroit. It is located at the intersection of Broadway and John R. The station takes its name from the street named Broadway. It also serves nearby Ford Field (home to the NFL team Detroit Lions), Detroit Opera House and the Harmonie Park area.

See also

 List of rapid transit systems
 List of United States rapid transit systems by ridership
 Metromover
 Transportation in metropolitan Detroit

References

External links
 DPM station overview
entrance from Google Maps Street View

Detroit People Mover stations
Railway stations in the United States opened in 1987
1987 establishments in Michigan